Truman G. Futch Jr. (October 1, 1891 – March 24, 1960) was an American state senator and judge in Florida. He served as president of the state senate. He also served three terms in the Florida House of Representatives. As a Lake County, Florida judge he was involved in the trials of the Groveland Four. He denied an attempt to prosecute sheriff Willis McCall who shot two of them during an alleged escape attempt while the sheriff was transporting them. He was also involved in a school segregation case. He once issued a subpoena to Florida  governor LeRoy Collins. Futch died on March 24, 1960.

He declared Jesse Delbert Daniels insane and the 19 year-old was committed to a mental institution until he was freed 14 years later.

Futch was born in Hampton, Florida.

Futch liked to whittle.

References

Florida state senators
1891 births
1960 deaths
People from Bradford County, Florida
Florida state court judges
20th-century American politicians
20th-century American judges